Jaime Gerschuni Pérez, popularly known as Jaime Pérez (1928–2005) was a Uruguayan politician and leader of the Communist Party of Uruguay.

References

1928 births
2005 deaths
Uruguayan people of Lithuanian-Jewish descent
Jewish Uruguayan politicians
Communist Party of Uruguay politicians